The .30-06 JDJ is a firearm cartridge designed by J.D. Jones.

Overview

The .30-06 JDJ is a modified .30-06 Springfield cartridge designed to be used in the Thompson Center Arms Contender single-shot pistol. The idea behind it is to replicate the ballistics of a .30-06 fired from a rifle in a Contender pistol. 

Currently, the .30-06 JDJ is not offered by any manufacturers. Cases and bullets for it can be purchased from various companies for handloaders.

Description

Compared to a default .30-06 round, the .30-06 JDJ contains has a smaller neck that is at a 60-degree angle. However, the biggest difference is that the .30-06 JDJ has little body taper compared to the original .30-06 cartridge. This allows the .30-06 JDJ to hold an extra 5 grains of water (4.875 cm3) compared to the .30-06 Springfield, allowing one to put more gunpowder into the cartridge. 

This round manages to replicate in a pistol the ballistics of a .30-06 round fired from a rifle.

Gallery

See also

 .30-06 Springfield
 .30-06 Remington

References

Pistol and rifle cartridges
JDJ cartridges